USS ARD-17 was an  built for the U.S. Navy during World War II as an Auxiliary floating drydock. Like most of the ships of her class, she was not named but known only by her designation.

History
ARD-17 was built at Pacific Bridge Company in Alameda, California and delivered to the Navy in early 1944.

In July and August 1944, ARD-17 served a support role in the liberation of Guam.

In late September 1944,  towed ARD-17 from Guam to Palau. On 30 November 1944 ARD-17 was damaged by a near miss from a Japanese bomber while anchored at Naval Base Kossol Roads, Palau.

In February 1945, ARD-17 and sister ship  were at Leyte Gulf servicing ships returning from Iwo Jima and preparing for Okinawa.

After the war, she eventually was returned to the United States, and for a time was laid up as part of the Atlantic Reserve Fleet at Naval Shipyard at Boston, Massachusetts.

On 1 December 1977, ARD-17 was stricken from the Naval Vessel Register, and sold the same day to Ecuador under the Security Assistance Program. Renamed Amazonas (DF-81), her current fate is unknown.

Commanding Officers
LCDR. Anderson, Anton	from 18 February 1944 to December 1945
LCDR. Wilson, Earnest C.from December 1945 to April 1946
LT. Barger, Lucian from April 1946 to 1 July 1946

References

External links
 

 

ARD-12-class floating drydocks
Ships built in Alameda, California
1944 ships
World War II auxiliary ships of the United States
Cold War auxiliary ships of the United States
Ships transferred from the United States Navy to the Ecuadorian Navy
Auxiliary ships of the Ecuadorian Navy
Floating drydocks of the United States Navy